Kasama Central is a constituency of the National Assembly of Zambia. It covers the northern part of Kasama and a rural area to the north of the city in Kasama District of Northern Province.

List of MPs

References

Constituencies of the National Assembly of Zambia
1964 establishments in Zambia
Constituencies established in 1964